The Putna is a right tributary of the river Siret in Vrancea County in Romania, in the historical region of Moldavia. It discharges into the Siret in Călienii Noi, near Vulturu.

Hydrography

Tributaries
The following rivers are tributaries to the river Putna (from source to mouth):

Left: Baba, Șipotu, Valea lui Ilie, Astrog (Stogu), Babovici, Pârâul Mărului, Greșu, Călinu, Slatina, Lepșa, Streiu, Mocearu, Deju, Caciu, Valea Sării, Tichiriș, Vidra, Vizăuți
Right: Pârâul de sub Arișoaia, Pârâul Bradului, Zburătura, Pârâul Țiganului, Cireșu, Tișița, Pârâul Porcului, Pârâul Câinelui, Carhagău, Coza, Văsui, Zăbala, Chilimetea, Valea Rea, Șoimul, Sturza, Milcov, Râmna

Towns and villages
The following towns and villages are situated along the river Putna, from source to mouth: Greșu, Lepșa, Tulnici, Negrilești, Bârsești, Valea Sării, Vidra, Garoafa, Vânători.

References

 
Rivers of Romania
Rivers of Vrancea County